The 2017 North Carolina Education Lottery 200 was the fifth stock car race of the 2017 NASCAR Camping World Truck Series and the 15th iteration of the event. The race was held on Friday, May 19, 2017, in Concord, North Carolina at Charlotte Motor Speedway, a 1.5 miles (2.4 km) permanent quad-oval. The race took the scheduled 134 laps to complete. At race's end, Kyle Busch, driving for Kyle Busch Motorsports, would complete a dominant performance with a clutch restart with three to go to win his 48th career NASCAR Camping World Truck Series win and his second of the season. To fill out the podium, Johnny Sauter of GMS Racing and Christopher Bell of Kyle Busch Motorsports would finish second and third, respectively.

Background 

The race was held at Charlotte Motor Speedway, located in Concord, North Carolina. The speedway complex includes a 1.5-mile (2.4 km) quad-oval track that was utilized for the race, as well as a dragstrip and a dirt track. The speedway was built in 1959 by Bruton Smith and is considered the home track for NASCAR with many race teams based in the Charlotte metropolitan area. The track is owned and operated by Speedway Motorsports Inc. (SMI) with Marcus G. Smith serving as track president.

Entry list 

 (R) denotes rookie driver.
 (i) denotes driver who is ineligible for series driver points.

Practice

First practice 
The first practice session was held on Thursday, May 18, at 5:00 PM EST, and would last for 55 minutes.

Second and final practice 
The second and final practice session, sometimes referred to as Happy Hour, was held on Thursday, May 18, at 7:00 PM EST, and would last for 55 minutes.

Qualifying 
Qualifying was held on Friday, May 19, at 4:45 PM EST. Since Charlotte Motor Speedway is at least a 1.5 miles (2.4 km) racetrack, the qualifying system was a single car, single lap, two round system where in the first round, everyone would set a time to determine positions 13–32. Then, the fastest 12 qualifiers would move on to the second round to determine positions 1–12.

Two drivers would fail to qualify: Brandon Brown and Cody Ware.

Full qualifying results

Race results 
Stage 1 Laps: 40

Stage 2 Laps: 40

Stage 3 Laps: 54

Standings after the race 

Drivers' Championship standings

Note: Only the first 8 positions are included for the driver standings.

References 

2017 NASCAR Camping World Truck Series
NASCAR races at Charlotte Motor Speedway
May 2017 sports events in the United States
2017 in sports in North Carolina